= Pocker =

Pocker may refer to:

- A short name for the pool game poker pocket billiards
- A common misspelling of the card game poker
